The Adorers of the Sacred Heart of Jesus of Montmartre OSB is a Catholic order of Benedictine nuns, often known as "Tyburn nuns". The order was founded in Paris but later moved to a new Mother House in London and established additional monasteries in nine other countries. The Nuns at the London monastery practise the Perpetual Adoration of the Blessed Sacrament and maintain a shrine dedicated to the Catholic martyrs of the English Reformation.

History

They were founded by a Frenchwoman, Marie-Adèle Garnier (Mother Marie de Saint-Pierre) in Montmartre (Mount of the Martyr), Paris in 1898.  In 1901 the French legislature passed Waldeck-Rousseau's Law of Associations which placed severe restrictions on religious bodies such as monasteries and convents and caused many of them to leave France. Mother Marie de Saint-Pierre therefore relocated the order in London in 1903, at Tyburn Convent, Bayswater Road, near Marble Arch. Near the convent was the site of Tyburn tree where 105 Catholic martyrs—including Saint Oliver Plunkett and Saint Edmund Campion—were executed during and following the English Reformation from 1535 to 1681. The nuns established at Tyburn the Martyrs' Shrine to honour the  more than 350 Catholic Martyrs who were executed in England during and after the Reformation.

Tyburn Convent is now the Mother House of the Congregation.

Devotion
Mother Mary of St Peter founded the Adorers to carry out Adoration of the Sacred Heart of Jesus in the exposed Blessed Sacrament, originally in the Basilica of the Sacred Heart at Montmartre. The religious foundation then moved to enclosure and Adoration in the monastic setting, building up numbers towards Perpetual Adoration of the Blessed Sacrament by the community. 

This Adoration was to be made in reparation for offences against the Sacred Heart and the Blessed Sacrament. Mystical experiences in the early Congregation in France confirmed that Adoration was needed to atone for sacrileges and blasphemies against the Blessed Sacrament committed by priests and lay people. The Foundress at this time also discerned a particular charism of prayer for priests.

Perpetual Adoration of the Blessed Sacrament has continued ever since the convent was established in London, except for wartime when the convent was bombed and Adoration was relocated to Wadhurst in the English countryside. Pilgrims and tourists from all over the world visit the shrine.

Rule of life

The Congregation follows the Rule of St Benedict as its rule of life. This is augmented by norms, a manual and a book of customs of the Congregation. 

The sisters wear the traditional black Benedictine habit, but with a modernised veil and guimpe (wimple). Postulants wear lay dress and a short black veil. Novices wear the habit with a white veil and white choir cloak. Junior professed sisters wear the black veil and Congregation medal and white choir cloak. Perpetually professed sisters wear the black veil, medal, ring, and white choir cowl.

The Mass and the Liturgy of the Hours are recited in the vernacular (English, Spanish).

Expansion
The Tyburn community has opened other monasteries in Scotland, Ireland (at Cobh), New Zealand (two foundations, Tyburn Monastery at Bombay, Auckland and Tyburn Monastery Cor Iesu Fons Vitae at Ngakaru, Rotorua in the Hamilton Diocese), Australia (at Riverstone), Peru, Ecuador, Colombia, and France at St Loup-sur-Aujon close to the birthplace of the Foundress, Mother Marie Adèle Garnier. The Rome monastery has been temporarily closed, and the Riverstone monastery will shortly relocate further inland and closer to the Blue Mountains. Although the Congregation was founded to carry out Perpetual Adoration, today each monastery mostly only carries out Adoration during the day, and shares this with the laity. A new foundation in Africa opened, but had to be closed again soon afterwards. The Congregation has also offered assistance to ageing Benedictine communities in Europe. 

The Congregation numbers around 60 professed sisters worldwide in total, plus some sisters in formation.

Notes

External links

 Mother Xavier McMonagle: A review of Tyburn Convent ‘Gloria Deo’ (2011 documentary film) at CTS Catholic Compass. Retrieved 23 February 2012

1898 establishments in France
Religious organizations established in 1898
Catholic religious institutes established in the 19th century
Catholic female orders and societies
Catholic Church in New Zealand
Catholic Church in the United Kingdom
Convents in England